Scrobipalpa oleksiyella is a moth in the family Gelechiidae. It was described by Peter Huemer and Ole Karsholt in 2010. It is found in the southern Ural Mountains.

Etymology
The species is named for Oleksiy Bidzilya in recognition of his important contribution to Palaearctic Gnorimoschemini.

References

Scrobipalpa
Moths described in 2010